Peter Tiivola (born September 5, 1993) is a Finnish professional ice hockey Forward. His is currently playing with Dinamo Riga in the Kontinental Hockey League (KHL).

Playing career
Tiivola made his Liiga debut playing with Espoo Blues during the 2013–14 Liiga season.

Following his eighth season in the Finnish Liiga, Tiivola signed his first contract abroad, agreeing to a one-year contract with Latvian based KHL club, Dinamo Riga, on 18 June 2021.

Career statistics

International

References

External links

1993 births
Living people
Ässät players
Espoo Blues players
Finnish ice hockey forwards
Kiekko-Vantaa players
Lukko players
Ice hockey people from Helsinki